George Dargo (July 22, 1935 – January 5, 2012) was an American legal scholar who specializes in American legal history and the legal system of Louisiana. He was a longtime law professor at New England Law Boston.

Biography 
Dargo grew up in Brooklyn, New York City, and graduated from Erasmus Hall High School in 1953. He graduated from Columbia College with a bachelor's degree in American history and was a classmate of biblical scholar Robert Alter. He then received his master's and doctorate degrees from Columbia. He also received a law degree from the Northeastern University School of Law. He became interested in law because his father was a law school graduate and taught in the New York City Public Schools.

Dargo joined the New England Law School faculty in 1983. Before that, he worked as a history professor and wrote a number of books about American legal history. His book Jefferson's Louisiana (1975, republished 2010) was called one of the most important studies of the Louisiana Purchase and its impact on the legal culture and legal system of the state.

Dargo died on January 5, 2012, of skin cancer in his Brookline home.

References 

1935 births
2012 deaths
American legal scholars
American historians
20th-century American historians
New England Law Boston faculty
Columbia College (New York) alumni
Columbia Graduate School of Arts and Sciences alumni
Northeastern University School of Law alumni